Sandra Frey (born 1966/1967) is a Swiss retired ice hockey player and referee. After playing for the Swiss national team, she became the first female referee to work in the men's Swiss League. She later became the first woman to referee a gold-medal game at the IIHF Women's World Championship, doing so in 1992, 1994, and 1997. She retired from on-ice officiating after the 1998 Winter Olympics women's ice hockey tournament, then worked as a referee supervisor for the Swiss Ice Hockey Federation and the International Ice Hockey Federation (IIHF). 

In December 2022, she was announced as the first female on-ice official to be inducted into the IIHF Hall of Fame.

Early life
Dombrowski was born  1966/1967, and grew up in Interlaken, Bern, Switzerland.

Playing career
Dombrowski represented Switzerland at the 1987 World Women's Hockey Tournament hosted in Toronto, an international tournament which predated International Ice Hockey Federation (IIHF) events for women. The Swiss team placed fifth of seven teams at the tournament.

In 1984, Dombrowski was one of the founders of the women's team, Damen Hockey Club Berner Oberländer Modis, better known as DHC BOMO, based in Matten bei Interlaken. DHC BOMO merged with DSC Thun in 1992, to become  and play in the Swiss Women's League.

Officiating career
After retiring as a player, Dombrowski became an ice hockey referee. She was the first female referee in the men's Swiss League, and the first to referee an exhibition game in the men's National League.

The IIHF World Women's Championship began in 1990, with mostly male on-ice officials, due to the shortage of female officials. Dombrowski became the first female to referee a Women's World Championship gold-medal game, when she officiated the 1992, 1994, and 1997 gold-medal games. Each of the three gold-medal games were Canada versus the United States.

The 1997 Women's World Championship was the first to use all-female on-ice officials, followed by the same at the women's tournament at the 1998 Winter Olympics. Dombrowski served as both a referee and a linesperson at the 1998 Winter Olympics, but missed the gold-medal game due to illness.

After retiring as a referee in 1998, Dombrowski remained active as a referee supervisor for men's and women's games in the Swiss Ice Hockey Federation and the IIHF. As a supervisor, she advocated for women's leagues to have on-ice officials who showed interest in the women's hockey, since it is different from men's hockey. In 1998, she became the first woman to sit on the IIHF Officiating Committee.

Honors and awards
In December 2022, Dombrowski was announced as the eighth official and first female referee to be inducted into the IIHF Hall of Fame. She is the first official to be so recognized in thirteen years – László Schell, the prior official to be inducted, was honored in 2009. The induction ceremony is scheduled to take place at the medal presentation ceremony of the 2023 IIHF World Championship on 28 May 2023 in Tampere, Finland.

Personal life
Dombrowski's married surname is Frey. In addition to her involvement in ice hockey, she is a civil engineer. As of 2012, she worked in Wattenwil and lived in Blumenstein. She previously worked at the firm Mätzener & Wyss Bauingenieure AG in Interlaken.

Notes

References

1960s births
Living people
Place of birth missing (living people)
Year of birth missing (living people)
20th-century Swiss women
21st-century Swiss women
People from Interlaken
Sportspeople from the canton of Bern
Swiss civil engineers
Swiss ice hockey officials
Swiss women's ice hockey players